Fas ( Momu, Bembi) is the eponymous language of the small Fas language family of Sandaun Province, Papua New Guinea.

Fas was once mistakenly placed in the Kwomtari family, confusing their classification. Its only demonstrated relative is actually Baibai, with which it is 40% cognate. See Fas languages for details.

Locations
Ethnologue lists Fas-speaking villages as Fas, Fugumui, Kilifas, Utai, and Wara Mayu villages of Walsa Rural LLG and Amanab Rural LLG of Sandaun Province.

Baron (2007) lists Fas-speaking villages as Yo, Sumumini, Wara Mayu, Kilifas, Fugumui, Fas 2, Fas 3, Finamui, Fugeri, Aiamina, Tamina 1, Nebike, Tamina 2, Utai, Mumuru, Savamui, and Mori.

References

Sources

External links 
 ELAR archive of Fas (Momu) language documentation materials
Fas word list (Austronesian Basic Vocabulary Database)

Languages of Sandaun Province
Fas languages